Import One-Stop Shop (IOSS) is an electronic portal in the European Union which serves as a point of contact for the import of goods from third countries into the European Union. The scheme aims to simplify the declaration and payment of value-added tax when importing goods into the European Union (EU). 

IOSS became available from 1 July 2021, and applies to distance sales of items imported from third territories or third countries with a value from 0 to 150 euros. Participation in the IOSS portal is voluntary.

Goals 
Until the introduction of the IOSS system, there was a VAT exemption on goods imported to the EU with a value from 0 to 22 euros.

Registration 
Registration for companies has been possible since 2021 April 1 on the IOSS portal of any EU member state, and registration in a single union member state is sufficient.

See also 
 One stop shop
 VOEC, a similar, but unrelated scheme implemented in Norway from 2020

References

Related legislation 
 Council Implementing Regulation (EU) No 282/2011
 Council Implementing Regulation (EU) No 282/2011
 Council Regulation (EU) No 904/2010 
 Council Directive (EU) 2017/2455
 Regulation (EU) 2017/2454,
 Implementing Regulation (EU) 2017/2459
 Council Directive (EU) 2019/1995
 Council Implementing Regulation (EU) 2019/2026
 Implementing Regulation (EU) 2020/194
 Council Decision (EU) 2020/1109
 Council Regulation (EU) 2020/1108
 Council Implementing Regulation (EU) 2020/1112
 Commission Implementing Regulation (EU) 2020/1318

E-commerce